The 1974–75 Algerian Cup is the 13th edition of the Algerian Cup. USM El Harrach are the defending champions, having beaten WA Tlemcen 1–0 in the previous season's final.

Round of 64

Round of 32

Round of 16

Quarter-finals

Semi-finals

Final

Match

References

Algerian Cup
Algerian Cup
Algerian Cup